Steven Ontiveros (born March 5, 1961) is a former pitcher in Major League Baseball. From 1985 through 2000, Ontiveros played for the Oakland Athletics (1985–88, 1994–95), Philadelphia Phillies (1989–90), Seattle Mariners (1993) and Boston Red Sox (2000). He batted and threw right-handed.  He attended the University of Michigan where he gained a Bachelor of Science degree in Physical Education.
 
In a ten-season career, Ontiveros posted a 34-31 record with 19 saves and a 3.67 ERA in 207 games pitched (73 as a starter). In 1995, Ontiveros earned a trip to the 1995 Major League Baseball All-Star Game after posting an American League-leading ERA of 2.65 in 1994. In giving up Jeff Conine's game-winning home run, in the same game, Ontiveros was credited with the loss on behalf of starter Randy Johnson.

He now owns and operates Player's Choice Academy in Scottsdale, Arizona. In 2008, he was the pitching coach for the Chinese National baseball team in the Beijing Olympics.

See also
 List of Major League Baseball annual ERA leaders

References

External links

Player's Choice Academy

1961 births
Living people
Albany-Colonie A's players
American League All-Stars
Oakland Athletics players
Philadelphia Phillies players
Seattle Mariners players
Boston Red Sox players
West Haven A's players
Clearwater Phillies players
Rochester Red Wings players
Tacoma Tigers players
Portland Beavers players
Reading Phillies players
Scranton/Wilkes-Barre Red Barons players
Memphis Redbirds players
Lake Elsinore Storm players
Colorado Springs Sky Sox players
Norfolk Tides players
Sacramento River Cats players
American League ERA champions
Major League Baseball pitchers
Baseball players from New Mexico
Michigan Wolverines baseball players
People from Tularosa, New Mexico
Valley Vipers players